Sun Ganqing (19 January 1919 – 5 January 2019) was a major general of the Chinese People's Liberation Army. He served as chief of staff of the Guangzhou Military Region and the Kunming Military Region, and commander of the Hainan Military District. He was a veteran of the Second Sino-Japanese War, Chinese Civil War, and Sino-Vietnamese War.

Biography
Sun was born in Linzi, Shandong, on 19 January 1919. He enlisted in the Eighth Route Army at the beginning of 1938. He joined the Communist Party of China at the same year. During the Second Sino-Japanese War, he fought with the Imperial Japanese Army in north China's Shandong province. After war, he was assigned to northeast China, where he successively served as regimental commander of the Northeast Field Corps and division chief of staff of the Fourth Field Army. During the Chinese Civil War, he participated in the Battle of Linjiang, Liaoshen Campaign, Pingjin Campaign, and Battle of Hainan Island.

After the founding of the Communist State in 1958, he became deputy commander of the Artillery Division of Guangzhou Military Region. He attained the rank of major general (shao jiang) in 1961. In July 1963 he was appointed commander of the Hainan Military District. In 1977 he was appointed chief of staff of the Kunming Military Region. He retired in September 1984.

Sun died of illness in Nanjing, Jiangsu, on 5 January 2019, two weeks before his 100th birthday.

Awards
 Second Class Medal, Order of Independence and Freedom
 Second Class Medal, Order of Liberation

References

1919 births
2019 deaths
People from Zibo
People's Liberation Army generals from Shandong
Chinese Communist Party politicians from Shandong